Platelet-derived growth factor receptor beta is a protein that in humans is encoded by the PDGFRB gene. Mutations in PDGFRB are mainly associated with the clonal eosinophilia class of malignancies.

Gene 
The PDGFRB gene is located on human chromosome 5 at position q32 (designated as 5q32) and contains 25 exons. The gene is flanked by the genes for granulocyte-macrophage colony-stimulating factor and Colony stimulating factor 1 receptor (also termed macrophage-colony stimulating factor receptor), all three of which may be lost together by a  single deletional mutation thereby causing development of the 5q-syndrome. Other genetic abnormalities in PDGFRB lead to various forms of potentially malignant bone marrow disorders: small deletions in and chromosome translocations causing fusions between PDGFRB and any one of at least 30 genes can cause Myeloproliferative neoplasms that commonly involve eosinophilia, eosinophil-induced organ injury, and possible progression to aggressive leukemia (see blow).

Structure 

The PDGFRB gene encodes a typical receptor tyrosine kinase, which belongs to the type III tyrosine kinase receptor (RTK) family and is structurally characterized by five extracellular immunoglobulin-like domains, a single membrane-spanning helix domain, an intracellular juxtamembrane domain, a split tyrosine kinase domain and a carboxylic tail. In the absence of ligand, PDGFRβ adopts an inactive conformation in which the activation loop folds over the catalytic site, the juxtamembrane region over a loop occluding the active site and the carboxy-terminal tail over the kinase domain. Upon PDGF binding the dimerization of receptor releases the inhibitory conformations due to auto-phosphorylation of regulatory tyrosine residues in trans fashion. Tyrosine residues 857 and 751 are major phosphorylation sites for the activation of PDGFRβ.

The molecular mass of the mature, glycosylated PDGFRβ protein is approximately 180 kDa.

Modes of activation 

Activation of PDGFRβ requires de-repression of the receptor's kinase activity.  The ligand for PDGFRβ (PDGF) accomplishes this in the course of assembling a PDGFRβ dimer.  Two of the five PDGF isoforms activate PDGFRβ (PDGF-B and PDGF-D).  The activated receptor phosphorylates itself and other proteins, and thereby engages intracellular signaling pathways that trigger cellular responses such as migration and proliferation. There are also PDGF-independent modes of de-repressing the PDGFRβ's kinase activity and hence activating it.  For instance, forcing PDGFRβ into close proximity of each other by overexpression or with antibodies directed against the extracellular domain.  Alternatively, mutations in the kinase domain that stabilize a kinase active conformation result in constitutive activation.

Unlike PDGFRα, PDGFRβ cannot be indirectly activated. This is because PDGFRβ recruits RasGAP and thereby attenuates Ras/PI3K activity, which is required to engage a feed-forward loop that is responsible for this mode of activation.

Role in physiology/pathology 

The phenotype of knock out mice demonstrates that PDGFRB is essential for vascular development, and that PDGFRB is responsible for activating PDGFRβ during embryogenesis.  Eliminating either PDGFRB, or PDGF-B reduces the number of pericytes and vascular smooth muscle cells, and thereby compromises the integrity and/or functionality of the vasculature in multiple organs, including the brain, heart, kidney, skin and eye.

In vitro studies using cultured cells indicate that endothelial cells secrete PDGF, which recruits PDGFRβ-expressing pericytes that stabilize nascent blood vessels.  Mice harboring a single activated allele of PDGFRB show a number of postnatal phenotypes including reduced differentiation of aortic vascular smooth muscle cells and brain pericytes.  Similarly, differentiation of adipose from pericytes and mesenchymal cells is suppressed.  Misregulation of the PDGFRβ's kinase activity (typically activation) contributes to endemic diseases such as cancer and cardiovascular disease.

PDGFRB mutations

5q- Syndrome 
Human chromosome 5 deletions that remove three adjacent genes, those for granulocyte-macrophage colony-stimulating factor, PDGFRB, and Colony stimulating factor 1 receptor, cause the Chromosome 5q deletion syndrome (5q- syndrome). This syndrome is a unique type of myelodysplastic syndrome characterized by a prolonged disease course, a low rate of transformation to an aggressive form of leukemia, and an anemia which in many patients is profound, refractory to traditional therapies (e.g. iron supplements, Erythropoietin), and requiring maintenance red blood cell transfusions. The disease is treated with a chemotherapy drug, lenalidomide.

PDGFRB Translocations 
Human chromosome translocations between the PDGFRB gene and at least any one of 30 genes on other chromosomes lead to myeloid and/or lymphoid neoplasms that are many ways similar to the neoplasm caused by the fusion of the PDGFRA (i.e. platelet derived growth factor receptor A or alpha-type-platelet derived growth factor receptor) gene with the FIP1L1 gene (see FIP1L1-PDGFRA fusion gene. The most common of these rare mutations is the translocation of PDGFRB gene with the ETV6 gene (also termed ETS variant gene 6).

PDGFRB-ETV6 translocations 
The ETV6 gene codes for a transcription factor protein that in mice appears to be required for hematopoiesis and maintenance of the developing vascular network. The gene is located on human chromosome 12 at the p13 position, consists of 14 exons, and is well-known to be involved in a large number of chromosomal rearrangements associated with leukemia and congenital fibrosarcoma. Translocations between it and the PDGFRB gene, notated as t(5;12)(q33;p13), yield a PDGFRB-ETV6 fused gene that encodes a fusion protein, PDGFRB-ETV6. This chimeric protein, unlike the PDGFRB protein: a) has continuously active PDGFRB-mediated tyrosine kinase due to its forced dimerization by the PNT protein binding domain of the ETV6 protein; b) is highly stable due to its resistance to ubiquitin-Proteasome degradation; and c) therefore over-stimulates cell signaling pathways such as STAT5, NF-κB, and Extracellular signal-regulated kinases which promote cell growth and proliferation. This continuous signaling, it is presumed, leads to the development of myeloid and/or lymphoid neoplasms that commonly include increased numbers of blood born and tissue eosinophils, eosinophil-induced organ and tissue injury, and possible progression to aggressive form of leukemia.

PDGFRB-ETV6 fusion protein-induced neoplasms often present with features that would classify them as Chronic myelomonocytic leukemias, juvenile myelomonocytic leukemia, Atypical or Philadelphia chromosome negative chronic myeloid leukemias, myelodysplastic syndromes, acute myelogenous leukemias, or acute lymphoblastic leukemias. The disease is now classified by the World Health Organization as one form of clonal eosinophilia. It is critical that the PDGFRB-ETV6 fusion protein-driven disease be diagnostically distinguished from many of the just cited other diseases because of its very different treatment.

Patients with the PDGFRB-ETV6 fusion protein-driven disease are more often adult males but rarely children. They present with anemia, increases in blood eosinophils and monocytes, splenomegaly, and, less often, lymphadenopathy. Bone marrow examination may reveal cellular features similar to that seen in the aforementioned diseases. Diagnosis is may by conventional cytogenetic examination of blood or bone marrow cells to test for PDGFRB rearrangements using Fluorescence in situ hybridization or to test for the fused FDGFRB-ATV6 fluorescence in situ hybridization and/or Real-time polymerase chain reaction using appropriate nucleotide probes. These patients, unlike many patients with similarly appearing neoplasms, respond well to the tyrosine kinase inhibitor, imatinib. The drug often causes long-term complete hematological and cytogenic remissions as doses well below those used to treat chronic myelogenous leukemia. Primary or acquired drug resistance to this drug is very rare. Additional adjuvant chemotherapy may be necessary if a patients disease is unresponsive to tyrosine kinase inhibitor therapy and/or progresses to more aggressive disease phase similar to that seen in the blast crisis of chronic myelogenous leukemia.

Other PDGFRB translocations 
The PDGFRB gene has been found to fuse with at least 36 other genes to form fusion genes that encode chimeric proteins that are known or presumed to possess: a) continuously active PDGFRB-derived tyrosine kinase activity; b) the ability to continuously stimulate the growth and proliferation of hematological stem cells; and c) the ability to cause myeloid and lymphoid neoplasms that commonly but not always are associated with eosinophilia. In all instances, these gene fusion diseases are considered types of clonal eosinophilia with recommended treatment regimens very different than those of similar hematological malignancies. The genes fusing to PDGFRB, their chromosomal location, and the notations describing their fused genes are given in the following table.

Similar to PDGFRB-ETV6 translocations, these translocations are generally in-frame and encode for fusion proteins with their PDGFRB-derived tyrosine kinase being continuously active and responsible for causing the potentially malignant growth of its myeloid and/or lymphoid harboring cells. Patients are usually middle-aged men. They commonly present with anemia, eosinophilia, monocytosis, and splenomegaly and have their disease classified as chronic myelomonocytic leukemia, atypical chronic myelomonocytic leukemia, juvenile myelomonocytic leukemia, myelodysplastic syndrome, acute myelogenous leukemia, acute lymphoblastic leukemia, or T lymphoblastic lymphoma. Diagnosis relies on cytogenetic analyses to detect breakpoints in the long arm of chromosome 5 by Fluorescence in situ hybridization. These patients usually respond well to imatinib therapy.

Primary familial brain calcification 
Primary familial brain calcification (see Fahr's syndrome) is a rare disease involving bilateral calcifications in the brain, predominantly in basal ganglia but also cerebellum, thalamus, and brainstem in patients presenting with diverse neurologic (e.g. movement disorders, parkinsonism, seizures, headache) features and psychiatric (e.g. cognitive impairment, mood disorders, psychotic symptoms, and obsessive-compulsive) disturbances. In a minority of cases, the disease is associated with apparent autosomal dominant loss of function mutations in PDGFRB or the gene which encodes a ligand that simulates PDGFRB, Platelet-derived growth factor, PDGFB. PDGFRB is extensively expressed in the neurons, chorioid plexus, vascular smooth muscle cells, and pericytes of the human brain, particularly the basal ganglia and the dentate nucleus. It is proposed that signal transduction through PDGFRB maintains blood–brain barrier integrity and that loss of the PDGFRB receptor or its ligand, PDGFB, disrupts  the blood–brain barrier, subsequently promoting (peri)vascular calcium deposition and thereby causing the dysfunction and death of neurons.

Interactions 

PDGFRB has been shown to interact with:

 CRK, 
 Caveolin 1, 
 Grb2, 
 NCK1, 
 NCK2,
 PDGFR-α, 
 PTPN11, 
 RAS p21 protein activator 1, 
 SHC1  and
 Sodium-hydrogen antiporter 3 regulator 1.

Notes

See also 
 Cluster of differentiation
 Platelet-derived growth factor receptor
 Kosaki overgrowth syndrome

References

Further reading

External links 
 

Clusters of differentiation
Genes on human chromosome 12
Tyrosine kinase receptors